Erik Louis Darnell (born December 2, 1982) is an American professional stock car racing driver. He is the grandson of former USAC and NASCAR driver Bay Darnell, who also started three NASCAR races (including one for Holman Moody). Darnell formerly drove for Roush Fenway Racing, joining the team in 2005 after being a co-winner on the Discovery Channel program Roush Racing: Driver X, along with David Ragan.

Racing career

Early career

Darnell began racing at the age of 12 in the River Valley Kart Club. He won the championship in the purple plate class in his second year of competition, later racing Allison Legacy Series cars after go karts. His first year of super late models was at Illiana Motor Speedway, with Erik finishing 3rd in the final standings with 1 win. Erik beat the best Wisconsin super late model drivers to win the 2003 Wisconsin Challenge Series championship. At that time his five wins were the most in the series' history. He set the super late model track record at Lake Geneva Raceway in 2004.

2004–2012: NASCAR and ARCA
Darnell drove in his first NASCAR Craftsman Truck Series race at Milwaukee in 2004, finishing 26th. He also raced in numerous NASCAR touring series races.

Darnell drove in several NASCAR touring series and six ARCA races in 2005.

Darnell raced full-time in the Truck Series in 2006. He had twelve top-10 finishes in 25 events, and he was the series' Rookie of the Year. He continued to drive for the team in 2007, as well as testing the team's Busch Series cars. On April 28, 2007, Darnell won the O'Reilly Auto Parts 250 at Kansas Speedway for his first Truck Series win.

Darnell started the 2008 season by capturing the pole position at the Daytona International Speedway. He won his second career CTS race in June 2008 at Michigan International Speedway by .005 of a second over Johnny Benson.

For 2009, Darnell planned to compete in 15 NASCAR Nationwide Series races, sharing the car with Cup Series driver David Ragan, and would also run for Rookie of the Year. The first race on his schedule was at Richmond International Raceway where he finished 12th. Also, Darnell competed in seven of the final 11 NASCAR Sprint Cup Series races. He ran the car at Atlanta, Loudon, Kansas, Talladega, Texas, Phoenix, and Homestead. Darnell competed in the No. 96 Academy Sports + Outdoors Ford for the Atlanta, Talladega, and Texas races. He alternated the ride with Bobby Labonte.

In 2010, Darnell found himself without a ride for most of the season due to the lack of sponsorship. He continued to stay on at Roush Fenway Racing as a practice-qualifying driver for Carl Edwards at the standalone Nationwide Series races. Darnell did a 3 race deal to drive Roush's No. 16 Ford in the Nationwide Series. His best finish was 14th at Dover and Texas.

In 2011, Darnell returned to the Cup Series, driving for Whitney Motorsports in several races. In 2012, he competed for The Motorsports Group (formerly Key Motorsports) in the Nationwide Series.

2013–present: Post-NASCAR career

Darnell didn't race in NASCAR during 2013. He won the Dick Trickle 99 Super Late Model Oktoberfest race at LaCrosse Fairgrounds Speedway in October 2013. He has made occasional starts in various Midwest series since. Darnell led much of the second half of the 2019 Oktoberfest ARCA Midwest Tour race at La Crosse Fairgrounds Speedway before finishing third behind Ty Majeski.

2021: Return to NASCAR
On May 3, 2021, it was revealed through the release of the entry list for the Truck Series race at Darlington that Darnell would drive the No. 45 for Niece Motorsports in that race with sponsorship from his former sponsor at Roush, Northern Tool + Equipment. This would be his first start in NASCAR since 2012 and first in the Truck Series since 2008.

Motorsports career results

NASCAR
(key) (Bold - Pole position awarded by qualifying time. Italics - Pole position earned by points standings or practice time. * – Most laps led.)

Sprint Cup Series

Nationwide Series

Camping World Truck Series

ARCA Re/Max Series
(key) (Bold – Pole position awarded by qualifying time. Italics – Pole position earned by points standings or practice time. * – Most laps led.)

References

External links

 

Living people
1982 births
People from Lake County, Illinois
Sportspeople from the Chicago metropolitan area
Racing drivers from Illinois
NASCAR drivers
ARCA Menards Series drivers
American Speed Association drivers
ARCA Midwest Tour drivers
RFK Racing drivers